William Rae may refer to:
 Sir William Rae, 3rd Baronet (1769–1842), Scottish Lawyer and Member of Parliament
 William Rae (bishop) (died 1367), Bishop of Glasgow
 Willie Rae,  Chief Constable of Strathclyde Police
 William Rae (English footballer), English footballer who played for Glossop North End F.C. in 1901
 Willie Rae (footballer, born 1924), Scottish footballer (Rangers FC, Queen of the South)
 William Rae (Hamilton), Scottish footballer who played for Hamilton Academical F.C.
 William Archibald Rae, businessman and provincial level politician from Alberta, Canada
 William Fraser Rae (1835–1905), Scottish journalist and author
 William Rae (firefighter) (1869–1904)

See also
William Ray (disambiguation)
William Wray (disambiguation)